El Centro de la Raza in Seattle, Washington, United States, is an educational, cultural, and social service agency, centered in the Latino/Chicano community and headquartered in the former Beacon Hill Elementary School on Seattle's Beacon Hill. It was founded in 1972 and continues to serve clients in Seattle, King County and beyond. It is considered a significant part of civil rights history in the Pacific Northwest.

History

In the early 1960s thousands of Latinos in Seattle, nearly all of whom were seeking employment, found themselves lacking a traditional community center: a barrio, with a Latin American-style plaza. In early 1972, the ESL Program at South Seattle Community College suddenly found themselves without a physical home.   Inspired by the 1970 occupation by Native Americans of the decommissioned Fort Lawton in Seattle's Magnolia neighborhood, which resulted in the founding of the Daybreak Star Cultural Center, members of the ESL program occupied an empty school building originally built in 1904 in Seattle's Beacon Hill neighborhood that had been closed due to declining student enrollment. On October 11, 1972 the group established itself as El Centro de la Raza.

Leaders of the building takeover quickly won a pledge from Seattle Public Schools superintendent Forbes Bottomly that no effort would be made to evict them by force. The school district even arranged to open a back door for fire safety. The school had a sprinkler system, but its water long had been cut off. After three months of occupying the building and numerous rallies, petitions and letters, the Seattle City Council agreed to hear their case. At one point, pressing for an audience, supporters of the occupation had laid siege to the City Council's chambers. The people who occupied the building joked that they were simply implementing advice from Washington governor Dan Evans, "advocating use of empty schools for community needs, such as child care". The City Council finally approved the lease, but mayor Wes Uhlman vetoed the action. Supporters then occupied the mayor's office and were arrested. An accord was finally reached with a five-year lease signed January 20, 1973 at $1 rent annually.

Cofounder Roberto Maestas, executive director until 2009, worked with community leaders Larry Gossett, Bob Santos, and Bernie Whitebear, also known as the Gang of Four as they established a unique ethnic alliance that lead to the founding of El Centro de la Raza.

More than 20 years later, Maestas would remark, "I found that the only way to get things done in this city is to do it -- and then work it out… It took five to six years for the building to become up to code. Everything had to be repaired, replaced or installed. With the help, love and dedication of the community, the organization's building was refurbished piece by piece. Money was donated. Grants were awarded. Materials were donated, as well. Laborers volunteered time. Plumbers gave services. Heating and plumbing were installed. The roof was fixed. Vinyl siding was put in place. The classrooms were spruced up."

In 2007, El Centro celebrated its 35th anniversary with a gathering of nearly 1,000 people at the Washington State Convention and Trade Center in Seattle.

Social activism 
During the early 1980s, when the Reagan Administration was supporting the Nicaraguan Contras, El Centro played a major role in convincing the Seattle City Council to adopt Managua as a sister city, despite strong initial opposition from Seattle City Council. El Centro's bond with Nicaragua was forged before the Sandinistas took power in 1979. The relationship between El Centro and Managua began following the 1972 Nicaragua Earthquake and El Centro was able to coordinate relief efforts in the Seattle area.

The organization continued to practice direct action. When the Washington Natural Gas Company cut off El Centro's heat the teachers and children of the child-development center sat in the office of the CEO of Washington Natural Gas until the gas was restored.

Affordable housing

In 2015 El Centro de la Raza built moderately priced apartments south of its main building – 110 units, home to about 350 people. These apartments are designed for families making 30-60 per cent of the average median annual income in Seattle, or $24,000 to $49,000. The apartments have been built within easy access to El Centro de Raza and the Beacon Hill Light Rail station

Notes

External links

Oral history interview with Roberto Maestas, 2005 — Seattle Civil Rights and Labor History Project
 

1972 establishments in Washington (state)
Beacon Hill, Seattle
Hispanic and Latino American culture in Washington (state)
Non-profit organizations based in Seattle
Organizations established in 1972